Activision Blizzard, Inc. is an American video game holding company based in Santa Monica, California. It was founded in July 2008 through the merger of Activision, Inc. (the publicly traded parent company of Activision Publishing) and Vivendi Games. It is traded on the Nasdaq stock exchange under the ticker symbol ATVI, and since 2015 has been a member of the S&P 500 Index. Activision Blizzard currently includes five business units: Activision Publishing, Blizzard Entertainment, King, Major League Gaming, and Activision Blizzard Studios.

The company owns and operates additional subsidiary studios, as part of Activision Publishing, including Treyarch, Infinity Ward, High Moon Studios, and Toys for Bob. Among major intellectual properties produced by Activision Blizzard are Call of Duty, Crash Bandicoot, Guitar Hero, Tony Hawk's, Spyro, Skylanders, World of Warcraft, StarCraft, Diablo, Hearthstone, Heroes of the Storm, Overwatch, and Candy Crush Saga. Under Blizzard Entertainment, it invested in esports initiatives around several of its games, most notably Overwatch and Call of Duty. Activision Blizzard's titles have broken a number of release records. , it was the largest game company in the Americas and Europe in terms of revenue and market capitalization.

The company has also been involved in multiple notable controversies, including allegations of infringed patents and unpaid royalties. In late July 2021, it was sued by the California Department of Fair Employment and Housing on allegations of sexual harassment and employee discrimination. The suit triggered an investigation by the U.S. Securities and Exchange Commission, multiple workplace walkouts, the resignation or dismissal of several employees, the loss of multiple company event sponsors, and hundreds of workplace harassment allegations.

Microsoft announced its intent to acquire Activision Blizzard for $68.7 billion on January 18, 2022. If approved, Activision Blizzard would become a division of Microsoft Gaming, making Microsoft the third largest gaming company (behind Tencent and Sony). 

In December 2022, the Federal Trade Commission announced it would challenge the Activision Blizzard merger, and opened court proceedings.

In January 2023, the European Commission announced it would prepare a statement opposing the   Activision Blizzard deal, which would give them an Antitrust Warning.

History

Background and formation (2007–2008)
The original Activision company was founded in 1979, as a third-party developer for games on the Atari Video Computer System. In 1988 the company expanded into non-gaming software and renamed itself Mediagenic. This venture was not successful, incurring heavy losses. In 1991 a group of investors led by Bobby Kotick bought the company. Kotick instituted a large restructuring to reduce debt, including renaming the company back to Activision and moving it to Santa Monica, California. By 1997 the company was profitable again. Kotick spent the next decade expanding Activision's products through acquisitions of around 25 studios. This resulted in Activision publishing several successful series of games, including Tony Hawk's, Call of Duty, and Guitar Hero. However, by around 2006, the popularity of massively multiplayer online (MMO) games started to grow. Such games provide a constant revenue stream to their publishers, rather than only a single purchase, making them a more valuable proposition. None of Activision's subsidiaries had an MMO or the capability to make one quickly. Activision was also facing tougher competition from companies like Electronic Arts, as well as slowdowns in sales of their key game series.

Around 2006, Kotick reached out to Jean-Bernard Lévy, the CEO of the French media conglomerate Vivendi. Vivendi at that time had the games division Vivendi Games, a holding company principally for Sierra Entertainment and Blizzard Entertainment. Kotick wanted to get access to Blizzard's World of Warcraft, a successful MMO, and suggested a means to acquire this to Lévy. Lévy instead offered that he would be willing to merge Vivendi Games with Activision, but only if Vivendi kept majority control of the merged company. According to those close to Kotick, Kotick was concerned about this offer as it would force him to cede control of Activision. However, after talking to Blizzard's CEO Mike Morhaime, Kotick recognized that Vivendi would be able to give them inroads into the growing video game market in China.

Kotick proposed the merger to Activision's board, which agreed to it in December 2007. The new company was to be named Activision Blizzard and would retain its central headquarters in California. Bobby Kotick of Activision was announced as the new president and CEO, while René Penisson of Vivendi was appointed chairman. The European Commission permitted the merger to take place in April 2008, approving that there weren't any EU antitrust issues in the merger deal. On July 8, 2008, Activision announced that stockholders had agreed to merge, and the deal closed the next day for an estimated transaction amount of US$18.9 billion.

Vivendi was the majority shareholder, with a 52% stake in the company. At this point, Lévy replaced René Penisson as chairman of Activision Blizzard. The merger was completed on July 10. While Blizzard retained its autonomy and corporate leadership in the merger, other Vivendi Games divisions such as Sierra ceased operation. With the merger, Kotick was quoted stating if a Sierra product did not meet Activision's requirements, they "won't likely be retained." Some of these games ultimately were published by other studios, including Ghostbusters: The Video Game, Brütal Legend, The Chronicles of Riddick: Assault on Dark Athena, and 50 Cent: Blood on the Sand. However, a number of Sierra's games such as Crash Bandicoot, Spyro, and Prototype were retained and are now published by Activision.

New titles and sales records (2009–2012)
In early 2010, the independent studio Bungie entered into a 10-year publishing agreement with Activision Blizzard. By the end of 2010, Activision Blizzard was the largest video games publisher in the world. The 2011 release of Activision Blizzard's Call of Duty: Modern Warfare 3 grossed $400 million in the US and UK alone in its first 24 hours, making it the biggest entertainment launch of all time. It was also the third consecutive year the Call of Duty series broke the biggest launch record; 2010's Call of Duty: Black Ops grossed $360 million on day one; and 2009's Call of Duty: Modern Warfare 2 brought in $310 million. Call of Duty: Black Ops III grossed $550 million in worldwide sales during its opening weekend in 2015, making it the biggest entertainment launch of the year.

In 2011, Activision Blizzard debuted its Skylanders franchise, which led to the press crediting the company with inventing and popularizing a new toys-to-life category. The first release Skylanders: Spyro's Adventure was nominated for two Toy Industry Association awards in 2011: "Game of the Year" and "Innovative Toy of the Year". Skylanders: Spyro's Adventure and its sequels were released for major consoles and PC, and many were released on mobile devices as well.

Split from Vivendi and growth (2013–2014)

On July 25, 2013, Activision Blizzard announced the purchase of 429 million shares from owner Vivendi for $5.83 billion, dropping the shareholder from a 63% stake to 11.8% by the end of the deal in September. At the conclusion of the deal, Vivendi was no longer Activision Blizzard's parent company, and Activision Blizzard became an independent company as a majority of the shares became owned by the public. Bobby Kotick and Brian Kelly retained a 24.4% stake in the company overall. In addition, Kotick remained the president and CEO, with Brian Kelly taking over as chairman. On October 12, 2013, shortly after approval from the Delaware Supreme Court, the company completed the buyback, along the lines of the original plan. Vivendi sold half its remaining stake on May 22, 2014, reducing its ownership to 5.8%. and completely exited two years later.

Activision Blizzard released a new title, Destiny, on September 9, 2014. The game made over $500 million in retail sales on the first day of release, setting a record for the biggest first day launch of a new gaming franchise. On November 5, 2013, the company released Call of Duty: Ghosts, which was written by screenwriter Stephen Gaghan.  On its first release day the game sold $1 billion into retail. In 2014, Activision Blizzard was the fifth largest gaming company by revenue worldwide, with total assets of US$14.746 billion and total equity estimated at US$7.513 billion.

S&P 500 and new divisions (2015–2021) 
Activision Blizzard joined the S&P 500 stock index on August 28, 2015, becoming one of only two companies on the list related to gaming, alongside Electronic Arts. The company released the next iteration of the Skylanders franchise in September 2015, which added vehicles to the "toys to life" category. On September 15, 2015, Activision and Bungie released Destiny: The Taken King, the follow up to the Destiny saga. Two days later, Sony announced that the game broke the record for the most downloaded day-one game in PlayStation history, in terms of both total players and peak online concurrency.

Activision Blizzard  acquired social gaming company King, creator of casual game Candy Crush Saga, for $5.9 billion in November 2015.

In November 2015, Activision Blizzard announced the formation of Activision Blizzard Studios, a film production arm that would produce films and television series based on Activision Blizzard's franchises. The outfit is co-headed by producer Stacey Sher and former The Walt Disney Company executive Nick van Dyk.

In June 2017, Activision Blizzard joined the Fortune 500 becoming the third gaming company in history to make the list after Atari and Electronic Arts.

In its 2018 fiscal year earnings call to shareholders in February 2019, Kotick stated that while the company had seen a record year in revenue, they would be laying off around 775 people or around 8% of their workforce in non-management divisions, "de-prioritizing initiatives that are not meeting expectations and reducing certain non-development and administrative-related costs across the business", according to Kotick. Kotick stated that they plan to put more resources towards their development teams and focus on esports, Battle.net services, and the publisher's core games which include Candy Crush, Call of Duty, Overwatch, Warcraft, Diablo, and Hearthstone. Prior to this, Activision Blizzard and Bungie agreed to terminate their distribution deal with Destiny 2 as it was not bringing in expected revenue for Activision, with Bungie otherwise retaining all rights to Destiny. This transaction allowed Activision Blizzard to report  as part of its 2018 fiscal year filings.

The company announced that Daniel Alegre would replace Coddy Johnson as president of Activision Blizzard effective April 7, 2020, with Johnson transitioning to special advisory role.

During the second quarter of 2020, the company's net revenues from digital channels reached $1.44bn due to the growing demand for online games driven by COVID-19 lockdowns. By January 2021, the company's net value was estimated to be  based on its stock trading price due to the ongoing demand for video games from the COVID-19 pandemic.

In April 2021, Fernando Machado, former Brazilian executive at Burger King, joined the company as chief marketing officer (CMO). Kotick will remain eligible to receive annual bonuses, and while he agreed to reduce his target bonus by 50% as well, he potentially can earn up to 200% of his base pay based on the company's performance.

Workplace misconduct lawsuit and proposed acquisition by Microsoft (2021–present)

As a result of a two-year investigation, on July 20, 2021, the California Department of Fair Employment and Housing (DFEH) filed a suit alleging sexual harassment, employment discrimination and retaliation on the part of Activision Blizzard. The details of the allegations involve accusations of inappropriate behavior towards women and fostering a "frat boy" culture. The company's management initially tried to pass off the allegations as false, which led to employees sharply criticizing the management's lack of seriousness in the matter. Even after CEO's Bobby Kotick's open letter to employees that said their initial response was improper and that they would be internally reviewing matters, employees still staged a walk-off to protest the lack of action the company had taken in regards to the lawsuit. DFEH's lawsuit brought a second lawsuit against the company by its shareholders asserting it falsified knowledge of these problems in their financial statements, though this suit was dismissed due to failure to meet thresholds for claims, and led the U.S. Securities and Exchange Commission to begin evaluating the company. The Equal Employment Opportunity Commission had also filed suit against Activision-Blizzard from their own investigation of the workplace conditions but the company had settled the same day it was filed, which included setting aside an  relief fund for affected employees. Kotick requested the board to reduce his pay to the bare minimum required by California law in August 2021 and withhold his bonuses until the lawsuit was resolved, after a  bonus package he received in July 2021 following investors criticism on the size of the package. A Wall Street Journal report in November 2021 alleged that Kotick knew about misconduct and sexual harassment within the company without reporting them to the board of directors, leading to an increased pressure on Kotick to leave the company. The lawsuit became a debated matter in the industry as it touches on the Me Too movement and lack of unionization for video game developers to protect them from such mistreatment.

On January 18, 2022, Microsoft announced that it would be acquiring Activision Blizzard for $68.7 billion in an all-cash deal, or approximately $95 per share. Activision Blizzard's stock price jumped nearly 40% that day in pre-market trading. The deal would make Microsoft the third-largest gaming company in the world and the largest headquartered in the Americas, behind Chinese company Tencent and the Japanese conglomerate Sony. Goldman Sachs will serve as the financial advisor to Microsoft, and Allen & Company will be Activision's financial advisors. Simpson Thacher will serve as legal advisor for Microsoft while Skadden will serve as legal advisor for Activision. The deal has been approved by both companies' board of directors and is expected to close in 2023 following international government regulatory review of the action. Upon completion of the deal, Activision Blizzard would be a sibling entity to Xbox Game Studios under a new Microsoft Gaming division with Phil Spencer as its lead. The deal would also allow Microsoft to offer Activision Blizzard games on its Xbox Game Pass service. Spencer also spoke to reviving some of the games in Activision Blizzard's past that he himself enjoyed, mentioning series such as King's Quest, Guitar Hero and Hexen: Beyond Heretic.

Kotick stated that he, Spencer, and Microsoft's CEO Satya Nadella have had discussions in 2021 on their concern of the power of Tencent, NetEase, Apple, Inc. and Google, and that Activision Blizzard lacked the computation expertise in machine learning and data analytics that would be necessary to compete with these companies. According to Kotick, this led to the idea of Microsoft, which does have those capabilities, acquiring Activision Blizzard at an attractive price point. In a statement released on Activision Blizzard's investor website, the company said its industry is the "most dynamic and exciting category of entertainment across all platforms" and that gaming will be the forefront of the development of the emerging metaverse. Some journalists saw this acquisition, and Microsoft's March 2021 acquisition of Bethesda Softworks, as a bid to compete against Meta Platforms, formerly known as Facebook.

The timing of the acquisition was reported by The Wall Street Journal and Bloomberg News to be in response to the ongoing DFEH lawsuit. Reports from both newspapers stated that Activision Blizzard had been considering a buyout from other companies, including Facebook parent company Meta Platforms, due to the weaker than expected financial performance of their latest game releases and production delays. Based on SEC filings related to the merger, Microsoft approached Activision Blizzard again in the days immediately following the November 2021 Wall Street Journal report regarding a buyout. While Kotick had been hesitant about selling the company, the board had gone ahead with the deal as they continued to fear the ongoing impact of the lawsuit while Kotick remained on the board The buyout would provide a graceful exit for Kotick in the future, ranging in $252.2-292.9 million over most scenarios.

According to official announcements, under the deal Kotick will remain the CEO of Activision Blizzard, and is expected to keep the position while the deal goes through regulatory processes, as Activision Blizzard remains independent from Microsoft until the deal closes. According to The Wall Street Journal, Kotick "will depart once the deal closes" under Microsoft's management, while Kotick said in an interview that he has an interest in remaining in the company. Microsoft has yet to speak directly about the Activision Blizzard lawsuit following news of the acquisition, however the company announced a week prior that it would be reviewing its own sexual harassment and gender discrimination policies.

Several Activision Blizzard employees have expressed cautious optimism with respect to the deal, with the ABK Workers Alliance, a group of employees pushing for unionization in the wake of the DFEH lawsuit, saying the acquisition did "not change the goals" of the Alliance. A report by Business Insider suggested several Microsoft employees have raised their concern on the deal with respect to the sexual harassment scandals and Activision Blizzard workplace culture, hoping for "concrete steps to make sure we aren't introducing a dangerous and unwelcome culture." On January 19, 2022, World Bank president David Malpass criticized the acquisition, contrasting the acquisition price with the smaller amount of bond financing available to developing countries during the COVID-19 pandemic. After Sony had stated that they expect Microsoft to honor all of Activision Blizzard's publishing agreements for multiplatform games, Spencer and Microsoft president Brad Smith reassured that Microsoft will continue these existing agreements and expressed their desire to keep Call of Duty and other popular Activision Blizzard games on PlayStation beyond the terms of these agreements, as well as explore the opportunity to bring these games to the Nintendo consoles.

Activision Blizzard's shareholders approved of the acquisition near-unanimously in April 2022. In the United States, the acquisition was reviewed by the Federal Trade Commission (FTC) rather than traditionally by the U.S. Department of Justice, as the agency had raised more concerns over mergers and acquisitions in the Big Tech sector in the last decade. U.S. Senators Elizabeth Warren, Bernie Sanders, Sheldon Whitehouse, and Cory Booker expressed their concerns about the merger to the FTC as part of the FTC's investigation, saying that both companies have "failed to protect the rights and dignity of their workers" and that the merger should be opposed if "the transaction is likely to enhance monopsony power and worsen the negotiating position between workers and the parties." In addition, the U.S. Securities and Exchange Commission (SEC) reviewed potential claims that investors close to Kotick used insider trading prior to the acquisition announcement; Activision Blizzard said they would fully cooperate with the SEC's review.

The New York City Employees' Retirement System, which are shareholders of Activision Blizzard, sued the company in April 2022, arguing that the company had made the acquisition deal quickly with Microsoft as to try to cover up the misdoings of Kotick that had been uncovered as part of the ongoing DCEH lawsuit and escape any liability.

Senior executives Lulu Cheng Meservey and Kerry Carr joined the Activision Blizzard board of directors in 2022.

Corporate structure 
Activision Blizzard is divided into three key business segments:
 Activision Publishing, which handles the development, production, and distribution of video games from its subsidiary studios. It also houses the Call of Duty League.
 Blizzard Entertainment, which handles the development, production, and distribution of Blizzard's games. It also maintains Battle.net, organizes BlizzCon, and houses the company's esports activities including MLG and the Overwatch League.
 King, which handles the development and distribution of its mobile games.

There are also two non-reporting segments within Activision Blizzard. Activision Blizzard Studios oversees the production of film and television entertainment based on the company's properties. Activision Blizzard Distribution provides logistical support for Activision Blizzard's distribution within Europe.

Esports initiatives 
Activision Blizzard owns the Call of Duty and StarCraft franchises, both of which have been popular as esports. On October 21, 2015, Activision Blizzard announced the upcoming establishment of a new e-sports division. Named Activision Blizzard Media Networks, the division is led by sports executive Steve Bornstein and Major League Gaming (MLG) co-founder Mike Sepso, with assets from the acquisition of the now defunct IGN Pro League. Bornstein was appointed the new division's chairman. On December 31, 2015, it was reported that "substantially all" of Major League Gaming's assets would be acquired by Activision Blizzard. The New York Times reported that the acquisition was intended to bolster Activision Blizzard's push into e-sports, as well as its plan to develop an e-sports cable channel. Reports indicated that MLG would be shuttered and that the majority of the purchase price would go towards paying off the company's debt. Activision Blizzard acquired MLG on January 4, 2016 for $46 million.

In November 2016, Blizzard Entertainment, a subsidiary of Activision Blizzard, announced the launch of Overwatch League,  a professional video gaming league. The league's first season began during the second half of 2017 with 12 teams. The league's structure is based on traditional sports structures, including recruiting traditional sports executives as team owners, such as Robert Kraft, owner of the New England Patriots, and Jeff Wilpon, COO of the New York Mets.

The inaugural Overwatch Grand Finals was played at the Barclays Center in Brooklyn in July 2018 and attracted 10.8 million viewers worldwide. The league hopes to have 18 teams competing during the second season in 2019, with the ultimate goal of 28 teams across the world.

In 2018, Activision Blizzard signed a multi-year deal with The Walt Disney Company to stream Overwatch League games on both ESPN and Disney XD cable channels. The company also secured an exclusive multi-year deal with Google to stream all subsequent Activision Blizzard esports events, including Call of Duty and Overwatch events, through YouTube, and to use Google's cloud services for its game hosting infrastructure; this came after a prior two-year deal with Twitch for the Overwatch League had concluded.

Call of Duty Endowment
Since 2009, when CEO Kotick launched Call of Duty Endowment (CODE), over 50,000 veterans have been placed in high-quality jobs. In 2013 CODE started the "Seal of Distinction" program, which recognizes non-profit organizations that are successful in placing veterans in good jobs. Winners receive a $30,000 grant to use in their veteran job placement activities. The goal of CODE is to help 100,000 US and UK veterans find high-quality jobs by 2024. The endowment helps soldiers transition to civilian careers after their military service by funding nonprofit organizations and raising awareness of the value veterans bring to the workplace.

Products
 List of Activision games
 List of Blizzard Entertainment games

Other legal disputes

Worlds, Inc.
Worlds, Inc. was issued several United States patents around 2009 related to "System and method for enabling users to interact in a virtual space", which generally described a method of server/client communications for multiplayer video games, where players would communicate through avatars. In early 2009, Worlds, Inc. stated its intent to challenge publishers and developers of MMOs, naming Activision as one of its intended targets. Worlds, Inc. had already challenged NCSoft for its MMOs in 2008. The companies ultimately settled out of court by 2010.

Worlds, Inc. launched its formal lawsuit against Activision Blizzard, including both Blizzard Entertainment and Activision Publishing, in March 2012, stating that Call of Duty and World of Warcraft infringed on their patents. Activision Publishing filed a separate patent infringement lawsuit in October 2013, asserting that Worlds, Inc. was using two Activision-owned patents in its Worlds Player software, but this suit was dismissed with prejudice by June 2014.

In Worlds, Inc. case against Activision, the judge issued a summary judgement in Activision's favor, as they had demonstrated that Worlds, Inc. had demonstrated the technologies of their patents in their client programs AlphaWorld and World Chat, released before the 1995 priority date, though this was related to filing irregularities that were subsequently corrected by the Patent Office. Activision did not challenge the updated patents through an inter partes review (IPR), and subsequently after a statutory one-year waiting period, Worlds, Inc. filed a subsequently lawsuit against Activision, asserting Call of Duty: Ghosts violated their resolved patents. Later, Worlds, Inc. stated the intent to add Bungie to the lawsuit contending that Destiny also fell afoul of their patents. Bungie subsequently filed three IPRs with the Patent Office for each of the three Worlds, Inc. patents at the core of the lawsuit.  While Bungie initially won its IPR ruling at the USPTO, on appeal in September 2018,  Worlds, Inc. won a ruling questioning whether Bungie had legal standing to file its IPRs.

The new Worlds, Inc. case against Activision Blizzard was heard on October 3, 2014. With Bungie's IPRs pending at the Patent Office, the judge put the trial on hold pending the outcome of the IPRs. Worlds, Inc. challenged the IPRs at the Patent Office, as they did not include Activision as an interested party, a requirement that would have been necessary given the publisher/developer relationship between Activision and Bungie. The Patent Office did not accept this argument, and subsequently agreed with the Bungie IPRs that portions of Worlds, Inc. patents were invalid. Worlds, Inc. appealed to the Federal Circuit Appeals Court, challenging the validity of the IPRs due to the lack of Activision's involvement. The Federal Circuit court ruled in favor of Worlds, Inc. in September 2018, invalidating the Patent Office's decision. Worlds, Inc.'s case presently remains at the Patent Office stage, which is re-reviewing the IPRs in consideration of the Federal Circuit's ruling.  The lawsuit was dismissed in 2021, when a US district court ruled that "Worlds' patents were abstract ideas that were not sufficiently transformative to be legally patentable."

Infinity Ward
In early 2010, Activision fired Vince Zampella and Jason West, two of the founders of its studio Infinity Ward, on the basis of "breaches of contract and insubordination"; the move caused several other Infinity Ward staff to resign. Zampella and West created a new studio, Respawn Entertainment, with help from Electronic Arts' partner program, hiring the majority of those that departed Infinity Ward in their wake.

Zampella and West filed a lawsuit in April 2010 against Activision, claiming unpaid royalties on the studio's Call of Duty: Modern Warfare 2. Activision filed a countersuit against the two, accusing the pair of being "self-serving schemers". Activision later sought to add Electronic Arts to their suit, discovering that Zampella and West had been in discussions with them while still working for Activision, and further added claims against Zampella and West that the two had not returned all material related to Call of Duty while they were working at Respawn. A separate lawsuit was filed against Activision in April 2010 by several current and former members of Infinity Ward on the same basis of lack of unpaid royalties.

All parties came to an undisclosed settlement to end all suits by May 2012. Electronic Arts and Activision had settled separately on Activision's charges of poaching employees, while the suits between Activision, Zampella, West, and the Infinity Ward employee group were settled by the end of May 2012. All settlements were made for undisclosed amounts.

See also
 Lists of video game companies
 List of video game publishers

Notes

References

External links

 

 
2008 establishments in California
American companies established in 2008
Companies based in Santa Monica, California
Former Vivendi subsidiaries
Holding companies established in 2008
Holding companies of the United States
Video game companies established in 2008
Video game companies of the United States
Video game development companies
Video game publishers
Announced mergers and acquisitions